Fareham Town F.C. is a football club based in Fareham, Hampshire, England. The club is affiliated to the Hampshire Football Association, and is an FA Charter Standard club.

History

Fareham Town were formed in 1947, when three local sides Fareham FC, Fareham Brotherhood FC and Fareham Youth Centre FC amalgamated together after at a public meeting in the town in 1946, it was suggested to form a football club for the town. The club joined the Portsmouth League and started playing their games at Beaconsfield Meadow, before moving to Bath Lane.

At the end of the 1948–49 season the club gained promotion to Division 3 (East) of the Hampshire League, and gained promotion to Division Two as champions at the first attempt. The club made further progress in the 1952–53 season when they finished as Runners-up in Division Two to gain promotion to Division One. Three seasons later the club then made its debut in the FA Cup, making it to the fourth qualifying round before being knocked out by Wycombe Wanderers. The club in the 1959–60 competition won Division One for the first time. Further success would follow when the club won Division One, five times in a row from the 1962–63 campaign. The club would go on to win the league twice more during the 1970s. In 1975 the club then moved to its present home of the Cams Alders ground.

With the club finishing runners up in the 1978–79 campaign the club successfully joined the Southern Football League, starting in the Southern Division. In the 1982–83 season the club was placed in the Premier Division of the league, when the league was re-structured. The club would then spend the next seven seasons in the Premier Division, during which time, they managed to get to the Semi-finals of the FA Trophy before losing to the eventual winners Kidderminster Harriers. At the end of the 1988–89 campaign the club finished 19th and were relegated to the Southern Division, where they would then spend the next nine seasons. During this time the club would win the Hampshire Senior Cup for the fourth time, when they beat Farnborough Town 4–1 in the final.

At the end of the 1997–98 season the club, decided to move down to the Wessex League, due to the finances involved in staying in the Southern League. Since then the club has remained in the top division of the Wessex League.

Stadium
Fareham Town play their home games at Cams Alders Football Stadium, Cams Alders, Palmerston Drive, Fareham, Hampshire, PO14 1BJ.

Cams Alders has a covered stand seating 450 people, whilst the rest of the ground is reserved for standing. The ground has floodlights, allowing evening games to be played.

Honours

League honours
Hampshire League Division One
 Winners (8): 1959–60, 1962–63, 1963–64, 1964–65, 1965–66, 1966–67, 1972–73, 1974–75 
 Runners-up (6): 1955–56, 1960–61, 1967–68, 1971–72, 1976–77, 1978–79  
Hampshire League Division Two
 Runners-up (1): 1952–53 
Hampshire League Division Three (East)
 Winners (1): 1949–50

Cup honours
Hampshire Senior Cup: 
 Winners (4): 1956–57, 1962–63, 1967–68, 1992–93
 Runners-up (3): 1959–60, 1997–98, 2003–04

Records

Highest League Position: 8th in Southern League Premier Division 1982–83
FA Cup best performance: First round 1979–80, 1985–86, 1986–87, 1988–89
FA Amateur Cup best performance: Second round 1973–74
FA Trophy best performance: Semi-final 1986–87
FA Vase best performance: Third round 2003–04, 2004–05, 2020-21

Staff

Former players
 Players that have played/managed in the football league or any foreign equivalent to this level (i.e. fully professional league).
 Players with full international caps.

Kevin Bartlett
Neal Bartlett
Robbie Carroll
Mark Chamberlain
Steve Claridge
Kevin Dillon
Darren Foreman
John Hold
Warren Hunt
Ross Irwin
Ian Juryeff
Dave Leworthy
Thomas McGhee
John McLaughlin
Paul Moody
Richie Moran
Ken Todd
Eric Webber
David West
John Smeulders

Former coaches
 Managers/Coaches that have played/managed in the football league or any foreign equivalent to this level (i.e. fully professional league).
 Managers/Coaches with full international caps.

  Mark Chamberlain
  Ray Crawford
  Jon Gittens
  Joe Laidlaw
  Richie Reynolds

References

External links

Up The Creek Forum

Football clubs in Hampshire
Wessex Football League
Association football clubs established in 1946
Southern Football League clubs
Football clubs in England
Fareham
1946 establishments in England